Melica patagonica is a species of grass that is endemic to South America.

Description
The leaf-sheaths are scabrous, tubular, are closed on one end and are glabrous on surface. They also have scabrous margins and pubescent surface. The axis of the panicle is dominant while the main panicle branches are appressed.

The pedicels are ciliate, curved, filiform, and hairy above. The spikelets have 1-2 fertile florets which are diminished at the apex while the sterile florets are barren, cuneate, and clumped with both its rhachilla and its floret callus being pubescent. Both the upper and lower glumes are keelless, membranous and are of the same size as spikelets. Their other features are different; Lower glume is elliptic with an acute apex while the upper one is lanceolate, and have obtuse apex.

The species' lemma have ciliated and hairy margins with obtuse apex. Its palea have ciliolated keels and emarginated apex. The fruits have caryopsis with additional pericarp and linear hilum.

Ecology
Its flowering time is from October to December.

References

patagonica
Flora of South America